Pinocchio is an East German film. It was released on November 3, 1967. Released in the US in February 1969.

Summary
A master carpenter creates a wooden puppet named Pinocchio. Through the course of the story, the puppet begins to act lifelike, develops a mind of his own, and wishes to be a real boy.  He even goes to school with real children, but is kidnapped and sold into slavery along with his friend Pippifax, so Pinocchio's creator/father, named Papa Gepetto, sets out looking for him.  Pinocchio rescues his friends and himself from the clutches of the evil Stromboli, and rescues his father from the belly of a giant fish.  In the end, Pinocchio gets his wish and turns into a real, flesh-and-blood boy.

Cast
 Martin Flörchinger: Papa Gepetto
 Alfred Müller: Stromboli
 Martin Hellberg: Arturo
 Vera Oelschlegel: Mirzilla the Fox
 Peter Pollatschek: Eusebius the Cat
 Marianne Wünscher: Euphrosina the Good Fairy
 Detlev Wolf: Pippifax
 Herwart Grosse: Mr. Lehrer, Schoolmaster
 Helmut Schreiber: Ringmaster
 Carola Zschockelt: Pudel
 Harald Popig: Malte
 Hans Hardt-Hardtloff: Karsten
 Jürgen Marten: A Father
 Detlef Salzseider: Thomas
 Andreas Nehring: Alfons
 Lutz Kruger: Eduard
 Heinz Müller: Konrad

External links
 
 https://web.archive.org/web/20120106210300/http://www.kiddiematinee.com/p-pin67.html

1967 films
1960s fantasy films
German fantasy films
German children's films
East German films
1960s German-language films
Pinocchio films
Puppet films
Films based on fairy tales
1960s German films